Gabriela Sabatini was the defending champion, but did not compete this year.

Martina Navratilova won the title by defeating Larisa Neiland 6–2, 6–2 in the final.

Seeds

Draw

Finals

Top half

Bottom half

References
 Official results archive (ITF) 
 Official results archive (WTA)

Toray Pan Pacific Open – Singles
1993 Toray Pan Pacific Open